The 2017–18 Beşiktaş J.K. season was the club's 114th year since its foundation, 96th season of competitive football and the club's 59th season contesting the Süper Lig, the top division of Turkish football. Beşiktaş were the defending champions of the Süper Lig, having finished first in 2016–17. The 2017–18 season lasted from 1 August 2017 to 30 June 2018;

Squad

Out on loan

Transfers

In

Out

Loans in

Loans out

Released

Friendlies

Competitions

Turkish Super Cup

Süper Lig

League table

Results summary

Results by matchday

Results

Turkish Cup

Fifth round

Round of 16

Quarter-finals

Semi-finals

UEFA Champions League

Group stage

Knockout phase

Round of 16

Squad statistics

Appearances and goals

|-
|colspan="14"|Players out on loan:

|-
|colspan="14"|Players who left Beşiktaş during the season:

|}

Goal scorers

Disciplinary record

References

Beşiktaş J.K. seasons
Turkish football clubs 2017–18 season